Oksana Aleksandrovna Verevka (born 22 November 1977 in Chernihiv, Ukraine) is a retired medley swimmer from Russia. She twice competed at the Summer Olympics (2000 and 2004), and is best known for winning the gold medal in the women's 200 m individual medley at the 1997 European Championships (LC).

References 
 Profile

1977 births
Living people
Russian female medley swimmers
Olympic swimmers of Russia
Swimmers at the 2000 Summer Olympics
Swimmers at the 2004 Summer Olympics
People from Quedlinburg
Medalists at the FINA World Swimming Championships (25 m)
European Aquatics Championships medalists in swimming